Puin may refer to:

 Gerd R. Puin German scholar and world's foremost authority on Qur'anic paleography
 Puin (brand) a Russian brand of canned food.